The women's 100 metres hurdles event at the 2014 African Championships in Athletics was held August 10–11 on Stade de Marrakech.

Medalists

Results

Heats
Qualification: First 3 of each heat (Q) and the next 2 fastest (q) qualified for the final.

Wind: Heat 1: -1.2 m/s, Heat 2: -1.2 m/s

Final
Wind: +0.1 m/s

References

2014 African Championships in Athletics
Sprint hurdles at the African Championships in Athletics
2014 in women's athletics